Nick McCloud (born July 9, 1998) is an American football cornerback for the New York Giants of the National Football League (NFL).

College career
He played college football at Notre Dame and North Carolina State.

Statistics

Professional career

Buffalo Bills
McCloud signed with the Buffalo Bills as an undrafted free agent on May 1, 2021. He was waived during final roster cuts on August 31, 2021.

Cincinnati Bengals
McCloud was claimed off waivers by the Cincinnati Bengals on September 1, 2021. He was waived on November 4, 2021.

Buffalo Bills (second stint)
On November 8, 2021, McCloud was signed to the Buffalo Bills practice squad. After the Bills were eliminated in the Divisional Round of the 2021 playoffs, he signed a reserve/future contract on January 24, 2022. He was waived on August 30, 2022.

New York Giants
On August 31, 2022, McCloud was claimed off waivers by the New York Giants.

NFL career statistics

References

External links
NC State Wolfpack bio
Notre Dame Fighting Irish bio
Cincinnati Bengals bio

1998 births
Living people
Players of American football from South Carolina
American football cornerbacks
NC State Wolfpack football players
Notre Dame Fighting Irish football players
Cincinnati Bengals players
Buffalo Bills players
New York Giants players